Sanjay Lall from Stanford University was named Fellow of the Institute of Electrical and Electronics Engineers (IEEE) in 2015 for contributions to control of networked systems.

References 

Fellow Members of the IEEE
Living people
Stanford University School of Engineering faculty
Stanford University Department of Electrical Engineering faculty
Year of birth missing (living people)
American electrical engineers